is a Japanese politician, most recently serving as the governor of Mie Prefecture from 2003 until 2011.

A native of Iitaka, Mie, Noro attended Keio University and obtained a Bachelor of Engineering degree. In 1979 he commenced his political career by becoming secretary to his father Kyōichi Noro, who had just been appointed as Minister of Health and Welfare in the cabinet of Prime Minister Masayoshi Ōhira.

In 1983 Kyōichi announced his retirement from politics, leaving Akihiro to contest his seat in the Mie No.2 district in the December 1983 general election. Akihiro was successful in the election and served in the House of Representatives in the Diet (national legislature) for four terms from 1983 until 1996. Electoral reforms introduced in 1993 saw the old system of multi-member constituencies abolished. Noro contested the newly created Mie No.4 district at the 1996 general election but lost to Norihisa Tamura. Noro then successfully contested the April 2000 mayoral election in Matsusaka, Mie. He resigned in April 2003 whilst still in his first term in order to contest the Mie gubernatorial election.

References

External links 
 Official website 

Governors of Mie Prefecture
Members of the House of Representatives (Japan)
Keio University alumni
1946 births
Living people